Yang Shaobo (born 20 May 2000) is a Chinese footballer currently playing as a midfielder for Beijing BSU.

Career statistics

Club
.

References

2000 births
Living people
Chinese footballers
Association football midfielders
China League One players
Atlético Madrid footballers
Beijing Sport University F.C. players
Chinese expatriate footballers
Chinese expatriate sportspeople in Spain
Expatriate footballers in Spain